Exploration Flight Test-1 or EFT-1 (previously known as Orion Flight Test 1 or OFT-1) was the first test flight of the crew module portion of the Orion Multi-Purpose Crew Vehicle. Without a crew, it was launched on December 5, 2014, at 12:05 UTC (7:05 am EST), by a Delta IV Heavy rocket from Space Launch Complex 37B at Cape Canaveral Space Force Station.

This mission design corresponds to the Apollo 2/3 missions of 1966, which validated the Apollo flight control system and heat shield at re-entry conditions planned for the return from lunar missions.

NASA heavily promoted the mission, collaborating with Sesame Street and its characters to educate children about the flight test and the Orion spacecraft.

Objectives 
The flight was intended to test various Orion systems, including separation events, avionics, heat shielding, parachutes, and recovery operations prior to its flight aboard the Space Launch System on the Artemis 1 mission. Artemis 1 launched on November 16, 2022, more than seven years after EFT-1.

Vehicle assembly   
EFT-1 Orion was built by Lockheed Martin. On June 22, 2012, the final welds of the EFT-1 Orion were completed at the Michoud Assembly Facility in New Orleans, Louisiana. It was then transported to Kennedy Space Center's Operations and Checkout Building, where the remainder of the spacecraft was completed.
The Delta IV rocket was put in a vertical position on October 1, 2014, and Orion was mated with the vehicle on November 11.

Flight 

The four-and-a-half-hour flight took the Orion spacecraft on two orbits of Earth.

During the flight, the crew module, a structural representation of the service module, a partial launch abort system containing only the jettison motor, and Orion-to-stage adapter were evaluated. The spacecraft remained attached to the dummy service module on the Delta IV's upper stage until re-entry began and relied on internal batteries for power rather than photovoltaic arrays, which were not contained in the structural representation. Data gathered from the test flight were analyzed by the critical design review (CDR) in April 2015.

After splashdown in the Pacific Ocean, crews from the USS Anchorage recovered the EFT-1 Orion crew vehicle. Plans were later made to outfit the capsule for an ascent abort test in 2017.

Launch attempts

Post-flight disposition of capsule
The Orion capsule used for EFT-1 is now on display at the Kennedy Space Center Visitor Complex, in the "NASA Now" exhibit.

Gallery

References

External links 

Orion MPCV homepage (NASA)
EFT-1 Fact sheet (NASA)
EFT-1 Press kit (NASA)
Animation of the EFT-1 mission (NASA)
Video of the launch of EFT-1 – 5 December 2014 (NASA)
Video of the landing of the EFT-1 Orion – 5 December 2014 (NASA/U.S. Navy)

2014 in the United States
Orion (spacecraft)
Spacecraft launched in 2014
Spacecraft which reentered in 2014
Articles containing video clips
Test spaceflights
Spacecraft launched by Delta IV rockets